Agrupación Deportiva Super Sego Fútbol Sala was a futsal club based in Zaragoza, Aragon. It was better known as Pinturas Lepanto or Sego Zaragoza.

The team played on pavilion Príncipe Felipe with capacity of 12,000 seats.

Seasons 1993–94 and 1994–95, the team was sponsored by Pinturas Lepanto.

History
The club was founded in 1983. At end of season 1996–97, the problems begin, with the unpaid wages to the players. At 1997–98 mid-season, the club was disqualified due a non-appearance in two matches. The reasons were again, the non-payment of wages to her players. After Sego Zaragoza disappearance, Sala 10 Zaragoza became the most representative futsal club in Aragon.

Season to season

6 seasons in División de Honor
2 season in 1ª Nacional A

Honours
División de Honor: 1
Winners: 1994–95
Semifinals: 1991–92, 1992–93, 1993–94
Quarter-finals: 1995–96
Copa de España: 1
Winners: 1992–93
Runners-Up: 1991–92
Semifinals: 1994–95
Supercopa de España: 1
Winners: 1993–94
Runners-Up: 1995–96

References

External links
Some information from Spanish-language Wikipedia
Article about Sego Zaragoza withdrawal

Futsal clubs in Spain
Sport in Zaragoza
Futsal clubs established in 1983
Sports clubs disestablished in 1998
1983 establishments in Spain
1998 disestablishments in Spain
Sports teams in Aragon